"What's New?" is a 1939 popular song composed by Bob Haggart, with lyrics by Johnny Burke.
It was originally an instrumental tune titled "I'm Free" by Haggart in 1938, when Haggart was a member of Bob Crosby and His Orchestra. The tune was written with a trumpet solo, meant to showcase the talents of band-mate Billy Butterfield. Crosby's orchestra recorded "I'm Free" the same day it was written.

The following year, the music publishers hired Johnny Burke to write lyrics for the tune. Burke's telling of the torch song is unique, using one side of a casual conversation between former lovers. Thus the song was retitled using the song's first line, "What's New?". The song was recorded with the new title in 1939 by Bob Crosby and His Orchestra with vocalist Teddy Grace. The song reached a peak chart position of #10.

Bing Crosby recorded the song on June 30, 1939 with John Scott Trotter and His Orchestra and this was the biggest hit recording of the song, peaking at #2 during a 10-week stay in the charts. Other popular 1939 recordings of "What's New" include Hal Kemp and His Orchestra with vocalist Nan Wynn, which peaked at #11, Benny Goodman and His Orchestra with vocalist Louise Tobin, which peaked at #7. Dexter Gordon regularly performed the song in the 1950s and 1960s.

"I'm Free" was "lyricized" again in the 1990s, this time by Catherine O'Brien, who also provided lyrics to the Haggart tune "My Inspiration." O'Brien's version, published in 1996, retains the original title, "I'm Free."

Composition and structure
The song is in the form A1 – A1– A2 - A1. It was originally written in the key of C major and modulates to A flat major and then F major to D-flat major for the bridge section before modulating back to C major. It begins on the tonic major, C major 7 before moving to a flat VII (B flat minor 7) in a II-V-I cadence in the key of A-flat major. That is replicated in the bridge section, going from F major 7 to E-flat minor 7 as part of a II-V-I cadence in the key of D-flat major.

Linda Ronstadt recording
"What's New" was the title track of a Triple Platinum 1983 album by Linda Ronstadt, one of three recordings she released backed by The Nelson Riddle Orchestra.  Linda's earnest version of the song, released as the album's first single, reached the Top 40 of the Cash Box Top 100 chart and peaked at #53 on the Billboard Hot 100.  It achieved far greater success at Adult Contemporary radio, where it spent several weeks in the Top Five.

Chart performance

Other notable recordings
 Louis Armstrong – Louis Armstrong Meets Oscar Peterson (1957)
 John Coltrane –  Ballads (1963)
 Larry Coryell – Cedars of Avalon (2002)
 Bob Crosby – "I'm Free" – 1938
 Ella Fitzgerald –  Like Someone In Love (1957) 
 Dexter Gordon – Our Man in Amsterdam (1969)
 Billie Holiday – Velvet Mood (1956)
 Helen Merrill – Helen Merrill  (1954) 
Frank Sinatra – Frank Sinatra Sings for Only the Lonely (1958)
Golden Gate Quartet (1939)
Ahmad Jamal – At the Pershing: But Not for Me (1958)

References

External links
"What's New?" at Jazz Standards

1938 songs
1939 songs
1939 singles
1930s jazz standards
Songs with music by Bob Haggart
Songs with lyrics by Johnny Burke (lyricist)
Benny Goodman songs
Al Hirt songs
Grammy Award for Best Instrumental Arrangement Accompanying Vocalist(s)
Jazz compositions in C major